Albert Fertsch was an American football and basketball coach. He served as the head football coach State Normal School at Cheney–now known as Eastern Washington University—in Cheney, Washington from 1913 to 1916, compiling a record of 4–9. Fersch was also the head basketball coach at Cheney Normal from 1912 to 1916, tallying a mark of 11–2.

Fertsch was born in Germany. He graduated from the University of Washington in 1910. After leaving Cheney, he was an administrator at the Indiana University extension in Gary—now known as Indiana University Northwest.

Head coaching record

Football

References

Year of birth missing
Year of death missing
University of Washington alumni
Eastern Washington Eagles football coaches
Eastern Washington Eagles men's basketball coaches
German emigrants to the United States